Stereocaulon arcticum is a species of snow lichen belonging to the family Stereocaulaceae.

Ecology
Stereocaulon arcticum is a known host to the lichenicolous fungus species:

 Arthonia stereocaulina
 Lasiosphaeriopsis stereocaulicola
 Opegrapha stereocaulicola

References

Stereocaulaceae
Lichen species
Lichens described in 1938
Lichens of the Arctic
Taxa named by Bernt Arne Lynge